Fillol  may refer to:

Álvaro Fillol (born 1952), former professional tennis player
Catherine Fillol, Duchess of Somerset
Jaime Fillol (born 1946), former tennis player
Jérôme Fillol (born 1978), French rugby player
John Fillol, MP for Essex
Ubaldo Fillol (born 1950), Argentinian footballer

See also
Fillols